Kamera may refer to:

 Kamera (genus), a genus of eukaryotes with only one known species.
 Poison laboratory of the Soviet secret services
 "Kamera", a song from Wilco's 2002 album Yankee Hotel Foxtrot
 Ivan Kamera (1897–1952), a Soviet military officer
 Kamera-Werkstätten, a photography company of Germany
 Aktuelle Kamera, a television newscast in the German Democratic Republic
 Goldene Kamera, a German film and television award

See also
 Camera (disambiguation)